Yalaka Venugopal Rao  (born 26 February 1982) is an Indian former cricketer. He played as a right-handed middle order batsman and right arm off-break bowler. He was the first Indian "super sub" in One Day International (ODI) cricket. He played large part of his career for his home Andhra Pradesh in first class cricket and then went on to play for India between 2005 and 2006. He also opened the batting for India in a one-day series in Zimbabwe. He has a brother Gnaneshwara Rao who has played for Kochi Tuskers Kerala in IPL.

International career
Venugopal Rao started his career playing for Andhra Pradesh in domestic matches and impressed Indian selectors with a First-class average of over 50 and List-A average of around 40. This included one innings in the Ranji Trophy for South Zone where he scored 223 against a touring England A team which included Test bowlers such as Simon Jones and Andrew Flintoff.

He consequently earned a call up to the national side for the 2005 Indian Oil Cup in July 2005, after captain Sourav Ganguly was dropped from the team. He made sporadic appearances throughout the Indian 2005/06 season, mostly when other players were being rested under a rotation policy. He was unable to establish a position in the team, and did not play any further ODIs after May 2006. His poor domestic form further lead him to out of contention for national team.

Indian Premier League
Rao was selected into the Deccan Chargers in the Indian Premier League in 2008. He was part of their successful 2009 campaign. He was bought by Delhi for 70 lakh INR for IPL 2011. For IPL 2014, he was purchased by Sunrisers Hyderabad for 55 lakh INR but was released after the season.

References

External links

Interview with Y.Venugopal Rao on Cricketfundas.com
Interview with Y.Venugopal Rao on Sportstar

1982 births
Living people
Indian cricketers
India One Day International cricketers
India Red cricketers
Andhra cricketers
Deccan Chargers cricketers
Delhi Capitals cricketers
Sunrisers Hyderabad cricketers
South Zone cricketers
Cricketers from Visakhapatnam
Maharashtra cricketers
Gujarat cricketers
Rajasthan cricketers